is a Japanese animation studio founded in 2017.

Works

Television series

Films

References

External links

  
 

 
Animation studios in Tokyo
Japanese animation studios
Japanese companies established in 2017
Mass media companies established in 2017
Suginami